Greater Mohali is an extension of Mohali city and includes the areas of Kharar, Lalru and Landran. This area comes under Greater Mohali Area Development Authority (GMADA).

See also
Zirakpur
Mundi Kharar
Lalru
New Chandigarh
Greater Chandigarh

References

External links

Cities and towns in Sahibzada Ajit Singh Nagar district
Planned cities in India
Mohali